Sarah Günther-Werlein (born 25 January 1983) is a German former footballer who played as a midfielder. She was capped for the Germany national team.

Honours
Germany
UEFA Women's Championship: 2005

References

External links
 Profile at DFB

1983 births
Living people
German women's footballers
Footballers at the 2004 Summer Olympics
Olympic bronze medalists for Germany
Footballers from Bremen
Germany women's international footballers
Hamburger SV (women) players
1. FFC Frankfurt players
Olympic medalists in football
Medalists at the 2004 Summer Olympics
Olympic footballers of Germany
UEFA Women's Championship-winning players
Women's association football midfielders